The 2004 Missouri lieutenant gubernatorial election was an election for the Lieutenant Governor of Missouri, held on November 4, 2008. Republican Peter Kinder won the election narrowly, becoming the first Republican  to hold the office since Edward Henry Winter in 1933.

Candidates

Republican
Peter Kinder, Missouri State Senator
Pat Secrest, Missouri State Representative

Democratic
Bekki Cook, former Missouri Secretary of State
Ken Jacob, Missouri State Senator

Libertarian
Mike Ferguson

Constitution
Bruce Hillis

Primary elections

Results

See also
 2004 United States gubernatorial elections
 2004 Missouri gubernatorial election

References

External links

2004 Missouri elections
Missouri
2004